iam8bit, Inc. is a media production and merchandising company, video game publisher and artist collective based in Los Angeles, California. iam8bit hosts an online store that primarily sells collectible vinyl records of video game soundtracks, but also sells t-shirts, artwork, pins and other merchandise. iam8bit also frequently collaborates with Skybound Games to produce physical editions of independent video games. The company also owns an art gallery in Los Angeles that hosts various exhibitions annually.

History 

iam8bit started off as an art show surrounding pop culture fandom in the spring of 2005. The event, and subsequent company of the same name, were created and founded by video game and tech journalist Jon M. Gibson, and film director Amanda White, who is also known for producing the mockumentary I'm Still Here.

After its inception as an art event, iam8bit became a full-fledged lifestyle brand, focused on the artistic side of gaming. Beginning with a collection of "limited edition" T-shirts adorned with popular images from the exhibition, the company would go on to design events and merchandising for other companies.

Chronicle Books published an official collection of pieces from the inaugural show in April 2005 entitled, iam8bit: Art Inspired by Classic Videogames of the '80s, and was promptly carried in stores like Urban Outfitters, Barnes and Nobles, Giant Robot, and many other museum and boutique shops. A sequel to the book, called SUPER i am 8-bit: More Art Inspired by Classic Videogames of the '80s, was published by Insight Editions in June 2010.

iam8bit, as a merchandising brand, started off with a collection of limited edition T-shirts adorned with popular images from the art exhibit. The company would branch out to be a collectible vinyl records in 2010, with the promotion of Disney's video game Tron: Evolution.

A partnership with Blik, a manufacturer of vinyl wall decals, was formed  after the company created a custom, large-scale window installation for iam8bit's office. The result was a series of removable Space Invader-style wall stickers that, after several years, had been a consistently selling product for Blik. In 2007, iam8bit formed another partnership with Couch Guitar Straps to create a line of straps created for use with Guitar Hero and Rock Band.

For New Line's 2008 DVD release of The King of Kong: A Fistful of Quarters, iam8bit produced numerous supplemental features, including the "iam8bit Music & Gallery," which featured Donkey Kong-inspired art from the first three years of the iam8bit art show, as well as an accompanying soundtrack by renowned micro-musicians like 8 Bit Weapon, ComputeHer, and others. For this DVD, Gibson, as a writer and producer, and director Gabe Swarr also created an original, one-minute animated short, entitled A Really, Really Brief History of Donkey Kong, featuring music by 8 Bit Weapon, which received both critical and fan praise. Gibson, along with IGN Entertainment Editorial Director Chris Carle, provided a full-length commentary track recounting the cultural and historical significance of the 1980s arcade scene.

Productions

Mega Man 9 Press Kit (2008) 

In the summer of 2008, iam8bit was hired by Capcom to create the cover artwork for Mega Man 9. The cover art, done by Gerald de Jesus (part of the iam8bit artist collective), was made to be similar the American box art of the original Mega Man game, often considered to be "ugly" by the fanbase. According to Chris Kramer, Senior Director of Communications and Community at Capcom Entertainment, "the marketing group [decided] if we were going to release a game that looked like it came from 1987 that we should run the whole marketing campaign as if we were working in the games industry in 1987".

A "limited edition" press kit using that cover art was then created by iam8bit. Being as faithful to the original 1987 release as possible, the iam8bit crew disassembled hundreds of vintage Nintendo Entertainment System cartridges, magnetized them, and inserted mini "asset" CDs inside, featuring an array of screenshots, character art, etc. originally intended for members of the media, but later sold to fans via the online Capcom Store. The cartridges were then packaged in a custom-created, classic-looking Nintendo Entertainment System box, complete with shrink-wrap and bargain bin price tags (i.e. "SALE $9.99"). The fanfare for the press kit resulted in eBay listings of upwards of $1,200, making it one of the most sought-after promotional items in video game history.

Tricell Progenitor Virus Detection Kit (2009) 

In March 2009, the Tricell Progenitor Virus Detection Kit was created to promote the release of Resident Evil 5 on Xbox 360 and PlayStation 3. The kit, designed to look like an off-the-shelf pregnancy tester, was sent to select news reporters and members of video game/technology media, and later sold in limited quantities to consumers via the Capcom Store. The box lacks all Capcom or iam8bit company branding, focusing only on the fictional corporation of Tricell from within Resident Evil 5.

Inside of the kit had Tricell-branded protective nitrile gloves, surgical mask, hand sanitizer, and a bio-hazard bag, as well as a two "Advanced Detection & Supression Technology Discs". Inserting the discs into the console had a fictitious anti-virus detector "analyze" your system, detecting various levels of infection with the Progenitor virus.

Tron Evolution Vinyl (2010) 

In promotion for the release of the 2010 video game "Tron: Evolution," iam8bit Productions produced a custom vinyl picture disc that was sent out to an exclusive list of journalists. Only 200 vinyls were reportedly printed, featuring some of the game's soundtrack produced by DJ Sascha Dikiciyan, and visual design by artist Jim Rugg.

Marvel VS Capcom 3 Fight Club LA (2011) 

Days before the launch of Marvel VS Capcom 3: Fate of Two Worlds, iam8bit threw another in their seminal "Fight Club" series. The event hosted over 1,500 fans over 3 hours and featured an almost complete version of the game. It was also the first public demo location to have the Nintendo 3DS handheld, featuring Super Street Fighter IV: 3D Edition. Community members started lining up for the event at 1:00 am, 19 hours before doors opened.

I'm With Coco (2010) 
In January 2010, in collaboration with artist Mike Mitchell, iam8bit took part in the viral sensation "I'm With Coco" (the original image was created by Mitchell).

The Legend of Zelda 25th Anniversary – Hyrule Room (2011) 

To commemorate The Legend of Zelda's 25th Anniversary, Nintendo of America enlisted the help of iam8bit to create a Zelda style conference room in their Redwood City, California headquarters. The design and artwork for the conference room was done by Gerald de Jesus, and featured various references to the series' games.

Alita: Battle Angel – Passport to Iron City (2019) 

In February 2019, Twentieth Century Fox collaborated with iam8bit to create "Passport to Iron City", a recreation of Alita: Battle Angels setting for fans to tour. "Passport to Iron City" was available in New York City, Los Angeles, and Austin, Texas.

Exhibitions 

The iam8bit art exhibition is produced annually and held in Los Angeles. Featured artists include Gary Baseman, James Jean, Tim Biskup, Seen, Luke Chueh, Joe Ledbetter, Jorge R. Gutierrez, Amy Sol, Brandon Bird, Mike Mitchell, and hundreds of others.

Games published

References 

Art exhibitions in the United States
Culture of Los Angeles
Video game festivals
Companies based in Los Angeles
Video game websites